A sledge, or sled, is a vehicle with runners for sliding.

Sledge may also refer to:

Places
Sledge, Mississippi, United States
Sledge Island, Alaska, USA

People
Sledge (surname)

Arts, entertainment, and media
Fictional entities
Sledge (Transformers), a fictional character
Sledge, a fictional character
Groups
Sister Sledge, an American musical group from Philadelphia

Other uses
Sledgehammer, a large hammer

See also
SLED (disambiguation)
Sledging (disambiguation)
Sleigh (disambiguation)